"Things Will Go My Way" is a song by American rock band the Calling. It was released on August 16, 2004, as the second single from their album Two. It peaked at number 34 on the UK Singles Chart, where it remained at its peak for two weeks.

Charts

References

2004 singles
2004 songs
The Calling songs
RCA Records singles
Songs written by Aaron Kamin
Songs written by Alex Band